The Tait trains were a wooden bodied Electric Multiple Unit train that operated on the suburban railway network of Melbourne, Victoria, Australia. They were introduced in 1910 by the Victorian Railways as steam locomotive hauled cars, and converted to electric traction from 1919 when the Melbourne electrification project was underway. The trains derived their name from Sir Thomas James Tait, the chairman of commissioners of the Victorian Railways from 1903 to 1910. The first cars were built during 1909 with the last entering service in 1952.

Tait trains were initially referred to as "Sliding Door" trains, as opposed to the Swing Door trains then in service. From the 1950s, they became known as Reds or Red Rattlers, following the introduction of the blue-painted Harris trains.

Layout

Tait trains had a partly open saloon layout, with bench seats running across the train, the saloon being divided by partitions into a number of smaller areas. Each seating aisle was provided with its own exterior sliding door.

Incandescent lighting, a ceiling with pressed tin patterns, luggage racks above head height, and beautifully stained woodgrain walls were fitted inside each compartment. Interiors were split into smoking and no-smoking compartments until late 1978 with the abolition of smoking on trains, and carriages were designated as first or second class until 1958 when one class suburban travel was introduced.

The exterior of the trains were of two main styles: the original cars had a clerestory roof, and those built from the late 1920s onward had a simpler arched roof.

From 1971, the interior was simplified to cut maintenance costs, with some doorway windows being replaced by metal and plywood, and the wooden latticed sun blinds being removed. The motor bogies on the trains were originally of pressed steel construction, being changed for a new design in cast steel in the 1930s.

In service

Pre-electrification
The production of Tait carriages began before electrification, with the intention that the necessary electrical equipment would be retrofitted when necessary.

The carriages were grouped as the P type, with codes like ACP indicating that there was a passageway connecting most of the compartments, rather than the older carriage style with each compartment isolated from its neighbours. In the 1910 recoding project, the P was changed to a normal-size, normal-font letter, i.e. ACP. However, most diagrams show the raised letter with the newer code, perhaps because they were drawn during the construction phase, around the same time as the recoding was being planned.

All compartments were linked with a through-corridor, though internal sliding doors were placed three compartments from one end. The carriages were not initially marked "Smoking" or "Non-Smoking".

ACP, AP, BCP, BP
Initial construction saw 48 ACP cars, 62 AP, 18 BCP and 62 BP carriages built in the period 1910 to 1913. The AP and BP carriages were of identical design, with capacity for 92 passengers each across nine compartments, except that the second-class BP carriages had lower-quality seating. Similarly, the ACP and  BCP cars shared a design in every way other than the seating. Those carriages were fitted with eight compartments for 82 passengers, and the ninth compartment was re-purposed for a train guard, and fitted with a raised cupola for the sighting of signals.

From 1915, more carriages were constructed as the electrification project gathered pace and requirements were locked in. Further ACP carriages 49–106, and BCP carriages 19–80 were constructed in 1915–1916. However, they did not have the standard carriage bogies, but were fitted with plate-framed bogies intended for the later fitting of traction motors. The cars also varied in having a well in the roof designed for later provision of electrical equipment: motors, pantographs etc. That gives a rough indication of when the decision was made to proceed with 1500 VDC overhead wiring for Melbourne's electrification, as opposed to earlier proposals for a third rail system.

Conversions for electrification
Conversion of Tait cars for electrification started in 1917, in preparation for trials and driver training on the Flemington Racecourse line, and later on the Sandringham line.

Some carriages were stored after conversion, awaiting traffic requirements. It is thought that those vehicles were held until around 1919/1920.

The converted carriages kept their existing codes, but with D, M or T appended, indicating Driver's compartment, Motor car (with drivers compartment) or Trailer. However, in 1921, the system was regarded as too complex, and coding was simplified, with all motored and driving carriages becoming second class, and all trailers becoming first class.

The conversion program was completed in 1922.

Driving motors—ACPM, BCPM, M
From 1917 through to 1921, ACP and BCP carriages were withdrawn from steam service in preparation for electrification. The carriages which were fitted with traction motors had been built with that in mind, having heavier underframes, bogies designed to support the motors, and a well in the roof to allow a pantograph to be fitted.

Seventeen of the ACP 49–106 range were recoded to ACPM. From 1916 on, a further 26 ACPM cars were built, bringing the fleet to 45. However, the entire class was recoded M in 1921, being given numbers 201M to 284M.

Similarly, 28 of the BCP cars in the range 19–80 were recoded to BCPM and, in 1916, the class grew by 30 units. In the 1921 renumbering, the ex-BCP/BCPM class became 294M-385M.

Additional M cars, 285–293 and 386–411, were built new in 1922. Further cars, with curved roofs, were built in 1925 and 1926, taking numbers 412M–441M. 442M and 443M were rebuilt from 18M and 44M, former Swing-door motors. Those cars ended up having the thinner Swing-door underframe with the larger Tait body, giving them a rather unbalanced look. The carriages entered service in 1936. Following that, 444M through 461M were built in the period 1944–1949, and the last of them entered service in 1951.

In 1968, four motors, 300M, 398M, 244M and 397M were modified to include driving cab at both ends, taking on new numbers 470M–473M. They were mainly used on the Eltham to Hurstbridge and the Alamein lines, where even a two-car set could not be justified at off-peak times.

In 1979, the deliveries of the new Hitachi fleet were catching up with the Tait numbering block, so some carriages were renumbered, using numbers that were not in use. That started with the gap 462M–469M and 474M–499M, and later cars took numbers of Tait motor cars previously scrapped. By 1983, deliveries of the Comeng fleet made even that measure insufficient, so the 19x remaining Motors had the prefix "1" added to their numbers: e.g. 383M became 1383M.

Parcel motors CM

In 1921, a decision was made to supplement the mail/newspaper distribution fleet with double-ended motor cars, having the interior of a typical bogie guards' van of the CE/CW/CV types.

Coaches 1CM and 2CM entered service in 1921, with a capacity of 25 tons each. In 1923, they were joined by a third vehicle, 3CM. That was partially paid for by the Electrical Engineering Branch, with a modified design featuring a centre cupola for viewing of the overhead wires. 3CM was run with the normal fleet, but was made available for overhead wire inspection if and when required. CMs 4 and 5 entered service in 1925 and 1926 respectively, both using the new arch/curved roof style between their two cupolas.

The fleet was used for cash transport, and as a staff-only taxi service for the use of crew members scheduled to start work between 3am and 5am (before the regular services started operating).

Extra coaches were built from the mid-1950s using former Swing Door carriages.

The parcels coach traffic dried up in 1988 when a railways' policy change saw a switch to road transport. Correspondence to stations is now delivered on a few select trains per week, noted in advance.

Driving trailers—ACPD, BCPD, D
When planning the initial electrification project, it was expected that some lines could be operated with single-carriage or two-carriage trains instead of requiring a full consist. The single-carriage, double-ended motors were sourced from the Swing Door fleet, although some Driving Trailer carriages were sourced from the Tait fleet. While it was initially thought that around twenty of those carriages would be needed for service, only eleven were converted in the early stages of the electrification project.

In the first half of 1921, six ACP carriages (16–17, 23, 92–93 and 52) and five BCP carriages (2–3, 8–9 and 18) were rewired and recoded with a "D" appended. New identities for the ACPD series were 1–2, 8, 10–12, while the BCPD cars kept their old numbers of 2–3, 8–9 and 18.

In 1922, following the simplification of the classification system, the last of the three ACPD cars were converted to M motorised carriages 244, 245 and 204 in 1922. They had previously been heavier-underframe carriages. The remaining eight driving trailers were recoded to D 201–202 and 208 (ex ACPD) and 211, 204–207 (ex BCPD) respectively. Further conversions direct from ACP and BCP carriages saw the class rise to eighteen D carriages, numbered 201–218.

In 1940, carriage 244T, originally 44AP, was converted to driving trailer 225D.

"Ringer" Trailers, T
The 48 lighter-framed ACP and BCP carriages not converted to driving trailers were known as "Ringer" trailer cars. The guard's compartment equipment was removed and the larger area was made available to passengers, often being used by those with prams or extra luggage. The compartment was identifiable by the lack of the word "GUARD", and a white circle painted on the door. The circle indicated to crew members that the vans were not fitted with a handbrake or emergency brake taps, normally found in carriages with the raised-profile roof of the guards' compartment.

The Ringer trailers had formerly been ACP 15, 19–22, 24–48 and BCP 1, 4–7 and 121–133 (ex. ACP 1–13). They took the number range 263T to 286T (ex ACP 25–48), 349T to 361T (ex ACP 1–13, later BCP 121–143), 362T to 367T (ex ACP 15, 19–22, 24) and 368T–372T (ex BCP 1 and 4–7).

From 1926 to 1927, the first batch of Ringer Trailer to Driving Trailer conversions were made, with trailers 365 and 368–372 converted to 224D, 219D, 220D, 221D, 222D and 223D.

From 1965 to 1972, all bar two of the remaining Ringer trailers (349T and 350T) were converted to full Driving Trailers and coded randomly into the range 226D–265D.

Trailers—APT, BPT, T
The plain trailer carriages were converted for electric traction between 1919 and 1922. That involved removal of the then-standard gas lighting and refitting with electric lighting, as well as through jumper cable connections for the driving and motor cars operating at each end.

The T fleet comprised the original 124 AP and BP carriages.

The AP fleet was initially relettered to APT, and the BP fleet to BPT. When the classes were simplified in 1921, only 39 APT and 28 BPT cars had been refitted with the required electrical equipment. Further conversions were straight from AP/BP to T. From 1922 on, ex-AP cars had 200 added to their numbers to indicate the Tait/Sliding door fleet; for example 37AP became 37APT then 237T. The ex-BP cars were renumbered into the range 287–348, keeping the sequence i.e. 1BP became 287T and 62BP became 348T.

Additional carriages were built, numbers T380 to T400 in 1922, T401–424 in 1926, and T427–T442 between 1944 and 1952.

As noted above, trailer 244T was converted to driving trailer 225D. This happened in 1940.

288T was temporarily recoded to second class, with a G car's shunting/braking equipment, in 1954.

Experimental Trailer 201BT
As a testbed for the new Harris cars then being developed, the body of incomplete 441T was reworked to a more modern design and released into service in 1950, with three sets of doors per side. The car was coded 201BT, and lasted in service until 1984.Film 368 - 6/1975Film 490 - 1/1976

Internally, the car was divided into three second-class compartments; the outer two at a little under 17 ft across and the middle compartment at a little under 23 ft. One compartment was reserved for smokers until 1976, when smoking was abolished on the suburban network.

The car went through a number of changes in seating arrangements and door types (and post-76, internal partitions), with seated capacity ranging from 70 to 90 (73 being the most commonly quoted figure) and 164–175 standing passengers in crush load conditions. Initially the vehicle featured three sets of double-leaf sliding doors per side, with 2 windows either end and 6 windows between each set of doors. Later, the outer sliding doors were singled, and an additional window was added to the centre section for a 2-D-7-DD-7-D-2 configuration.

The car was preserved pending restoration as a display at the Newport railway museum, although some believed it to have been scrapped in 1994. It is now stored in East Block at Newport Workshops, for future restoration by Elecrail.

A replacement 441T to the regular design was built and entered service in 1952.

Gas-lit trailers—G
In addition to the regular trailers cars, a project was undertaken to recycle older carriage underframes from the Swing Door conversion project. Some of those frames were used for PL type carriages, but others were used to create the very similar G type cars. Initially numbered 1G–97G, they were built between 1923 and 1926, with clerestory roofs, and nearly identical passenger facilities to the T series trailers 400–424. They shared the nine-compartment design, seating 94, but whereas the T cars had three smoking and six non-smoking compartments, the G cars were entirely set aside for smoking passengers, with four first-class and five second-class compartments. While there is no indication on the relevant diagrams, it seems likely that first-class area was at the east end and second-class at west end, to slot between the second-class Motor and first-class Trailer carriages when coupled into a seven-carriage set.

Externally, the cars were fitted with handrails and shunters' brake equipment at the west end. That was a temporary provision until the planned conversion of the  carriages into driving trailers, but eventually the equipment proved safe enough for daily use and the cars were left as-was. The brake equipment was used when shunting an M-T-G unit onto an M-T-T-M block, to build up the length of trains during peak periods.

During Easter, and for the three weeks around Christmas and New Year, the G cars were removed from suburban service and used to boost the capacity of the country rail network, taking advantage of the reduced number of suburban passengers at those times. The G cars were specially fitted with alternate gas-lighting equipment for use on country trains (hence the G code). An example of that type of use can be seen in Newsrail magazine of March 1988 (p. 78), in a photo dated 24 December 1936 of a Melbourne to Ballarat special. During Easter 1941, an additional train to Bendigo was recorded as A2965-A2837 hauling 51G-40G-57G-41G-145B-28AV-35G-8AW-7CW.

Additional carriages 98G to 103G were built as part of new sets in 1944, with pairs entering service in 1944, 1947 and 1950. Those cars were identical to their predecessors except that they were fitted with the more modern curved roofs.

Set configuration
Tait trains originally entered service as six-car sets, the majority made up of three "M" cars and three trailers. From the 1920s, sets were increased to a seven-car configuration, with the introduction of the "G" trailer cars. Those sets were made up of a four-car "block" and a three-car "unit", usually operating as an M-T-T-M+G-T-M set during peak hours. During the off-peak period, the three-car "unit" would be uncoupled and stored at Jolimont sidings.

As noted above, in peak traffic periods such as the Easter and the Christmas holiday seasons, the G type carriages were withdrawn from suburban service and used to boost the capacity of country trains.

The "D" type cars were the least common of the car types. By 1923, only 18 cars were fitted with driving equipment and coded "D". The rest became so-called "Ringer" trailers, with a white ring on the door indicating the compartment was available for the use of passengers. D cars were paired with M cars and run either in pairs, i.e. M-D-M-D, replacing an M-T-T-M set. However, in some cases, M-T-D sets ran on particularly flat, short-distance lines where late running, although annoying to the passengers, would not disrupt the entire system. One such example was the Altona Beach to Newport shuttle service, which ran hourly as of 1939.

The M-D+M-D sets became much more common when the suburban train fleet ballooned in 1964, with a "block" of cars made up M-D-M-D that could be split as required.

Motor cars were sometimes paired back-to-back for what was known as "E" trains. They were formed with two M cars acting as locomotives, hauling a train of typical outer-suburban or country stock. They ran to Frankston, where the train would split and steam engines would take the non-electrified carriages on to Mornington and Stony Point, and to Lilydale, where the train would split, and steam engines would take the non-electrified portion on to Healesville and Warburton. Those runs were abolished in 1958, following the arrival of the Walker railmotors, and operational practice changed to using connecting trains at the end of the electrified system, instead of running through carriages. A number of swing-door motor cars had been specially altered for E train use, but in practice they weren't always available, so Tait motors may have been required as a substitute.

One-car operation commenced in 1968, after the conversion of 470M the previous year and the end of union disputes over their introduction.

From 1960, some of the earlier Swing Door carriages were withdrawn and scrapped. Tait G cars that had been allocated to those sets were grouped together and, in conjunction with other carriages, were used on peak-hour services to and from Werribee. Those sets were later replaced by PL sets.

In May 1968, an eight-car Tait train was tested on the Frankston line, made up of three motor cars and five trailers, and entered service under the new timetable in August 1968. After 1973, the eight-car sets were reconfigured with a 50:50 motor–trailer mix to avoid special rosters restricting the three-motor-car sets to flatter lines.

From 1973, three-car sets were also reintroduced, using M-T-D consists, or occasionally M-T-M sets. Six-car M-T-T-T-T-M consists were also formed for peak hour use. Both of those were restricted to the flatter lines, where the lack of power would not be a major problem.

In 1975, a 14-car Tait train ran between the North Melbourne and Royal Park substations, to test a new protective relay device.

The Boat Train

In 1936 a short-lived experiment involved the exclusive use of six Tait carriages on a special train running from Flinders Street to Port Melbourne, to meet passengers off international ships. Called The Boat Train, the train was assembled using three M motor cars (242, 268, 380) and three T trailer cars (226, 321 and 330), in an M-T-M-T-T-M formation, likely as 242M-226T-268M-321T-330T-380M.

They were painted mid-blue, with silver roofs and black undergear. Red capital lettering was affixed to the roofs of the three M cars, above the middle compartments, with the name of the train. Floodlighting with incandescent globes was run along the sides of the carriage roofs, such that the entire train body was illuminated.

After final inspections by the three Railway Commissioners H. W. Clapp, N. C. Harris and M. J. Canny, and the architect A. V. Stephenson and the workshops manager H. V. James, the first run was scheduled for 7 March 1936. The consist departed Flinders Street station at 9:10am for Station Pier, to meet the Italian liner Esquilino. The return trip departed Station Pier at 10:15am. Following this, the train ran three return trips on the following Sunday night, to meet the SS Oronsay. These trains left Flinders Street at 10:30pm, 11:09pm and 11:32pm.

Shipping companies would publish in newspapers their six-monthly planned departures from Port Melbourne (P&O, Orient, Shaw Savill, Aberdeen & Commonwealth to England and Matson to the United States); ships to be met by The Boat Train would have an additional comment that the train was to leave Flinders St Platform 10, about 90 minutes prior to the vessel's departure time.

The train ran as required until October 1939, when disappointing patronage and the outbreak of World War II caused the service to be withdrawn. The six carriages were restored to normal service, and continued until the general withdrawal of the Tait fleet.

Photos of the train are noted as PTC collection H 1792 and 1793. A copy of the train is available in Microsoft Train Simulator.

Overhead Inspection Train

For the purposes of inspection of overhead wiring, carriage 3CM was constructed to a modified design with an overhead compartment for inspectors to watch the way that the overhead wiring reacted to contact with pantographs.

Later, 10CM was constructed with similar modifications from the normal design.

Inspection trains would often run with two randomly selected motor carriages, one either side of the inspection car which would have its own pantographs locked down.

On 6 October 1980 carriage 447M had a similar fitting added, and it was renamed the Greasing Car. It was painted bright yellow with most windows boarded over, had its traction motors removed, and large black letters declaring "OVERHEAD INSPECTION" were painted on both sides. Internally the car was fitted with a power generator and hydraulic equipment to lubricate the overhead wiring. The car was renumbered 1447M in 1983, and after a graffiti attack around 1995 it was painted all-over yellow.

Sometime in that period, 1447M was coupled with Harris motors 794M and 797M, with transition vans 320 and 329D (as 797-320-1447-329-794). The two Harris cars were fitted with rail greasing equipment for tight curves, and the five-piece train made regular runs around the electrified network. While 1447M was in all-over yellow and the two Harris cars in similar livery but with green/yellow Met stickers along the sides, the two D vans were in normal V/Line orange livery; the only alteration was the fitting of screw couplers at one end each to allow coupling to the Tait carriage.

In circa 1994, pantographs on the suburban trains were upgraded with carbon skid plates rather than steel, removing the need to apply grease to the overhead power lines as the carbon reduced wear on the overhead lines. 1447M and the two D vans were removed from overhead greasing service and the two Harris motors ran back-to-back as solely rail greasers. The two Harris motors were subsequently fitted with the upgraded pantographs and ran in rail greaser service until suffering a major breakdown in 2003. In later years the Greaser train was withdrawn, and now small automatic greasing pots are attached to the rails at tight curves. Overhead and rail inspection is now done using car MTH102 (coincidentally a former Harris car) hauled by two T class diesel locomotives.

Equipment
General Electric traction equipment was fitted to the trains, of the same type as that in the Swing Door trains and enabling the trains to be operated in mixed sets using multiple-unit train control.

Conversions and alterations
Incomplete trailer car 441T was converted to experimental trailer car 201BT in 1950 with double width sliding doors to test design features for the Harris train. Later, a new 441T was constructed.

In 1958 class designation on the suburban network was abolished, with all painted indications of former First- and Second-class ticketing requirements painted over within two days; it took a little while longer to standardise all seating, and until that happened there were stories of passengers rushing to the former first-class trailer cars for the more comfortable seating.

Four motor cars were converted to double ended motors in 1968–1970 and renumbered 470M to 473M. These were mainly used on the Hurstbridge and Alamein routes.

From the mid-1970s the cost of replacing damaged glass windows was becoming prohibitive, and so one in three windows was sheeted over, with plywood on the inside and painted steel on the outside. Some carriages were also fitted with communication doors and/or diaphragms allowing staff and passengers to walk between carriages, particularly on two-carriage trains.

Smoking was abolished in 1978.

447M was converted to an overhead inspection car in 1980.

Typical use
As of 1956, 584 Tait carriages were rostered for regular use (in conjunction with 218 Swing Door carriages).

76 seven-car sets of Tait cars were assembled as M-T-T-M-G-T-M, for use on the Broadmeadows to Sandringham (20), Williamstown Pier to Dandenong and Frankston (34), Glen Waverley to Fawkner and St Albans (19), Lilydale and Upper Ferntree Gully (1) and Thomastown and Hurstbridge (2) lines.

14x G cars were included in otherwise Swing-Door sets on the Box Hill lines, and a further four on the Thomastown and Hurstbridge group; two driving trailers were allocated to the Newport to Altona shuttle, and one M, two T and one G to the E Trains running towards Stony Point and Healesville.

This roster requires 229 of 261 M, 2 of 25 D and 95 of 103 G, but 230 T cars despite only 227 (plus 201BT) in service at the time. It is likely that G cars were used as substitutes for T cars, most likely in the E train sets. Alternatively some blocks could have been M-D-M-D, allowing for division of blocks for even shorter trains to save on operating costs late at night or on weekends.

Example roster (1981)
Roster as at 19.10.1981:

For 7-car sets, the first four (typically at the west end) are the Block, while the last three (typically at the east end) are the Unit.

The table totals 228 cars, with an additional 61 spare or undergoing painting, repair or scrapping.

Lowercase w and e indicate whether the car's driving compartment is facing west or east respectively, where applicable.

7-car sets were typically used on the Epping and Hurstbridge lines, with 19 sets required in a typical morning peak hour. On weekends, the four-car blocks were used, with the three-car units stabled to save on operating costs. Anything spare was used on the North Melbourne (or occasionally Camberwell) group of lines, which at the time did not have a connection to the City Loop, where wooden trains had been banned account fire risk. 6-car sets would be used on the Sandringham route, split offpeak and shared with the St Kilda and Port Melbourne lines, and if a path could be found across the junction, Epping and Hurstbridge. A single 2-car set was used on the Eltham-Hurstbridge shuttle weeknights, and on weekends the double-ended Motor car was used, with the driving trailer stabled. Two 2-car sets were used on the Saturday Camberwell-Alamein shuttle, with one pair on Sundays. From 4 October the Altona shuttle was discontinued, so the spare 2-car sets were coupled into a 6-car set and absorbed into that roster.

If being painted, Motors would be at Bendigo and all other types at Ballarat.

Cars renumbered have their previous identities noted.

Other cars not listed in sets:

Off Register / scrapping underway:
235D w, 236D w both at Spotswood
51G, 66G both at Spotswood, 78G at Newport
242M201M at Newport, 283M, 310M, 329M, 346M, 407M, 412M, 496M353M, 497M352M at Spotswood, 400M, 493M379M* at Jolimont, 487M328M at Bendigo
254T, 427T both at Spotswood, 350T

Spare:
15G, 56G, 98G
238M, 251M, 260M, 269M217M, 277M223M, 289M, 388M, 408M, 452M, 483M321M, 484M359M, 489M386M
205T, 224T, 230T, 236T, 251T, 292T, 301T, 302T, 306T, 419T, 423T, 425T, 436T
201BT held for preservation

Repairs:
245M (wired for 60W globes), 284M, 295M, 364M, 380M, 384M, 417M, 445M376M, 459M, 465M313M
389T, 396T

Painting:
89G, 102G
267M, 268M216M, 281M227M, 477M316M
406T, 430T, 442T

Retirement
The Tait trains were replaced from 1974 by the Hitachi trains sets, and later, the Comeng trains.

From 1981, the last 37 of them began to be replaced by 50 Comeng trains. Tait trains were not allowed in the City Loop after 1982, due to fire hazard presented by their wooden bodies, so they spent most of their final years on the Port Melbourne, St Kilda and Sandringham lines.

The longest-lived carriages of each class (lasting to 1984 or 1985) were:
M: 240, 243, 246, 248, 252, 254, 256, 267, 269, 273, 281, 284, 296 and 299
T: 203, 298, 346, 382, 383 and 394
G: 2, 6, 28, 35, 37, 48 and 51

A large number of carriages were burned for scrap at Kingston. However, the large number of complaints from local residents ended the practice, and a program of public sales followed.

Due to asbestos found in the brakeblocks, amongst other industrial problems, the last of the 7 Tait trains were withdrawn from service by 27 December 1984.

On Friday 15 February 1985, the "great carriage auction" was held at Newport Workshops with large quantities of vehicle bodies sold and proceeds donated to the Australian Railway Historical Society's museum. The first carriage listed sold for $540, and prices rose through the day to as much as $3,000. Pairs of bogies, if required, were an additional $600, and cranes, road haulage etc. were around $1,000 each. A total of 49xM, 24xT, 9xG and 2xD vehicles were sold, including a number that had not been transferred from either Jolimont Workshops or the Spotswood Reclamation Depot.

Preservation

Elecrail
Carriages 486M317M, 381M, 208T and 230D were retained by the then Public Transport Corporation as an operational heritage set, 486M was restored to its original number 317M. The heritage set is owned by VicTrack and in the care of Elecrail (a division of Steamrail Victoria). Elecrail have also restored 470M, 327M and 341T to working order, along with 201BT, 267M, 284M, 427M, 257D, 48G, 1471M (double ended, formerly 471M) and 2CM stored.

Due to the lack of door locks and other safety issues, the Tait cars had been banned from operating on the Melbourne rail network between 2004 and 2016. Their first run post-ban was on 12 November 2016 between two steam locomotives to provide motive power and air brakes, but with pantographs lowered and no internal lighting provided. The special was organised, from the West end, as D3639, 317M, 230D, 208T, 381M and K190, and operated by Steamrail Victoria and V/Line on behalf of the Level Crossing Removal Authority's festivals at Ormond, McKinnon and Bentleigh stations. Since then they have been used on a number of suburban trips in the same configuration. In April 2019, Steamrail announced that federal funding had been granted to restore the set to electric service by early 2020. The funding will be used to reinstate the automatic stopping trip system, provide radios and speedometers for the first time, and restore and upgrade the mechanical and electrical components to modern standards as required.

The set began testing and driver training in May 2021. Car 341T was also used on some of these tests. The set had its official re-launch on March 8, 2022, running from Steamrail's depot in Newport to Belgrave via Essendon.

Other
Overhead inspection/greaser car 1447M is owned by VicTrack and stored.

The Mornington Railway has restored 98G to operational condition, being used for children's birthday parties and other private charters.

Many Tait car bodies were sold privately. Several have been converted to railway-themed restaurants, and many others are on private properties.

218D & 220D are part of a former restaurant at Swan Hill (still on site in 2022).
265D, 1364M364M, 246T & 301T were used as café at the former Melaleuca Station, NSW (a steam hauled tourist tramway) until it closed in 2007.
1364M364M was then sold to Yarra Valley Railway, the body was later scrapped in 2014.
243M202M, 1388M388M & 203T (along with van TP3) were part of the Bass Station Restaurant (removed in 2005).
203T is now on display at State Coal Mine, Wonthaggi.
282M is at Red Rattler Retreat, Boorhaman and used for accommodation.
285M & 428M were used by the Blind Institute, Mitcham from 1977.
499M314M was at Red Rattler Bricks & Pavers, Hoppers Crossing from around 1999 until it was redeveloped in 2012.
1387M387M, 1485M349M, 485M & 268M216M are at Bay Park Scout Park, Mt Martha.
1445M376M, 445M, 241T & 248T are part of the former Choo Choo's Restaurant, Emerald (still on site in 2022).
317T was at the old Sandhurst Town, Bendigo from around 1994 (has since been removed).
338T was used at Melton McDonalds from around 1993 (has since been removed).
380T is at Griffith Caravan Village, NSW and used for accommodation.
394T is at Gemco Hall, Emerald (still on site in 2022).

Miniature and Model railways

7.25" Gauge
At Diamond Valley Railway, there is a four car passenger carrying TAIT unit running on occasional open days. It is 1/6th full size and can carry 15 passengers. This re-creates original carriages 437M+442M+438T+221D.  It runs on batteries as people get in the way of the overhead wire.

HO scale
Auscision Models has announced their intention to release plastic injection-moulded models of the Tait carriages sometime in 2019/2020. The sets were delivered in August 2021.

The eras listed below take the latest possible start and the earliest possible end for all carriages listed in each set; individual carriages within each package have a much wider period, and/or could be renumbered by the purchaser.

Trainbuilder has released a series of brass Tait carriages. The cars are all fitted with internal lighting, marker lights and headlights, but no interiors.

N scale

Brimbank models has a range of 3D-printed Tait carriage components which can be purchased and assembled for standard mechanisms. The carriages are available as complete-body kits, or as a range of parts. Parcels vans are also available. The cost is generally around $48:00 per carriage plus mechanisms for motor cars, which the purchaser must source separately.

References

External links

 Vicsig.net Tait Trains

Melbourne rail rollingstock
Electric multiple units of Victoria (Australia)
1500 V DC multiple units of Victoria